Ulrich Bapoh Luic (born 29 June 1999) is a German professional footballer who most recently played as an attacking midfielder for VfL Osnabrück. He is the nephew of Samuel Eto'o.

Career statistics

References

External links
 
 

1999 births
Living people
German footballers
Association football midfielders
Germany youth international footballers
German people of Cameroonian descent
VfL Bochum players
FC Twente players
VfL Osnabrück players
Eerste Divisie players
2. Bundesliga players
3. Liga players
German expatriate footballers
German expatriate sportspeople in the Netherlands
Expatriate footballers in the Netherlands